San Donato is a village in Tuscany, central Italy, administratively a frazione of the comune of San Gimignano, province of Siena. At the time of the 2001 census its population was 18.

San Donato is about 45 km from Siena and 7 km from San Gimignano.

References 

Frazioni of San Gimignano